This is a list of nuclear-powered submarines.

A
USS Alabama, SSBN-731
USS Alaska, SSBN-732
USS Albany, SSN-753
USS Albuquerque, SSN-706
USS Alexandria, SSN-757
, SN10
HMS Ambush, S120
S605 Améthyste 
USS Annapolis, SSN-760
HMS Anson, S123
INS Arighat
INS Arihant (ATV-1), SSBN-S02
HMS Artful, S121
USS Asheville, SSN-758
  (SSN)
HMS Astute, S119
HMS Audacious, S122
USS Augusta, SSN-710

B
USS Benjamin Franklin, SSBN-640
USS Bluefish, SSN-675
USS Boise, SSN-764
 
USS Boston, SSN-703
USS Bremerton, SSN-698
K-117 Bryansk
USS Buffalo, SSN-715

C
S603 Casabianca (ex-Bourgogne), SNA (SSN) 
INS Chakra
USS Charlotte, SSN-766
USS Cheyenne, SSN-773
USS Chicago, SSN-721
 (SSN)
HMS Churchill, S46
USS City of Corpus Christi, SSN-705
USS Colorado, SSN-788
USS Columbia, SSN-771
USS Columbus, SSN-762
USS Connecticut, SSN-22
HMS Conqueror, S48
HMS Courageous, S50
China SSN sub classes -  091 (Han), 093 (Shang), 095 (SSGN), 097 (Qin)
China SSBN sub classes - 092 (Xia), 094 (Jin), 096 (Tang), new-type 098 fourth-generation strategic nuclear submarine

D
USS Dallas, SSN-700
K-414 Daniil Moskovsky
 
RFS Dmitriy Donskoy, TK-208 (SSBN)
HMS Dreadnought, S101

E
S604 Émeraude, SNA (SSN)

F
USS Florida, SSGN-728

G
USS Georgia, SSGN-729
USS Greeneville, SSN-772
USS Greenling, SSN-614

H
USS Hampton, SSN-767
USS Hartford, SSN-768
USS Hawaii, SSN-776
USS Hawkbill, SSN-666
USS Helena, SSN-725
USS Henry M. Jackson, SSBN-730 (former USS Rhode Island)
USS Honolulu, SSN-718
USS Houston, SSN-713
USS Hyman G. Rickover, SSN-709

I
S615 L'Inflexible, SNLE (SSBN)
USS Indiana, SSN-789

J
USS Jacksonville, SSN-699
USS Jefferson City, SSN-759
USS Jimmy Carter, SSN-23
USS James Monroe, SSBN-622

K
USS Kentucky, SSBN-737
USS Key West, SSN-722
K-278 Komsomolets
B-276 Kostroma
Soviet submarine K-8
Soviet submarine K-19
Soviet submarine K-27
Soviet submarine K-43, Also leased to India as INS Chakra between 1988 and 1991 
Soviet submarine K-56
Soviet submarine K-131
Soviet submarine K-219
Soviet submarine K-429

L
USS La Jolla, SSN-701
K-3 Leninsky Komsomol
USS Los Angeles, SSN-688
USS Louisiana, SSBN-743
USS Louisville, SSN-724

M
USS Maine, SSBN-741
USS Maryland, SSBN-738
USS Memphis, SSN-691
USS Miami, SSN-755
USS Michigan, SSGN-727
USS Minneapolis-Saint Paul, SSN-708
USS Montpelier, SSN-765

N
USS Nautilus. SSN-571
USS Nebraska, SSBN-739
K-152 Nerpa
USS Nevada, SSBN-733
USS New Hampshire, SSN-778
USS Newport News, SSN-750
USS Norfolk, SSN-714
USS North Carolina, SSN-777
K-407 Novomoskovsk

O
USS Ohio, SSGN-726
USS Oklahoma City, SSN-723
USS Olympia, SSN-717
USS Omaha, SSN-692

P
USS Pasadena, SSN-752
USS Pennsylvania, SSBN-735
S606 Perle, SNA (SSN)
K-211 Petropavlovsk-Kamchatskiy
USS Philadelphia, SSN-690
USS Pittsburgh, SSN-720
BS-64 Podmoskovye
USS Portsmouth, SSN-707
USS Providence, SSN-719
K-336 Pskov

Q
Q-ship

R
S611 Redoutable, SNLE (SSBN)
HMS Renown, S26
HMS Repulse, S23
  (SSBN)
HMS Resolution, S22
HMS Revenge, S27
USS Rhode Island, SSBN-740
S601 Rubis (ex-Provence), SNA (SSN)

S
USS Salt Lake City, SSN-716
USS Sam Houston, SSBN-609
USS San Francisco, SSN-711
USS San Juan, SSN-751
USS Santa Fe, SSN-763
S601 Saphir (ex-Bretagne), SNA (SSN)
HMS Sceptre, S104
USS Scranton, SSN-756
USS Seahorse, SSN-669
USS Seawolf, SSN-21
 
USS Simon Bolivar, SSBN-641
HMS Sovereign, S108
HMS Spartan, S105
HMS Splendid, S106
USS Springfield, SSN-761
HMS Superb, S109
K-433 Svyatoy Georgiy Pobedonosets
  (SSN)
HMS Swiftsure, S126

T
HMS Talent, S92
S617 Téméraire, SNLE (SSBN)
USS Tennessee, SSBN-734
USS Texas, SSN-775
HMS Tireless, S88
USS Toledo, SSN-769
USS Topeka, SSN-754
HMS Torbay, S90
 (SSN)
HMS Trafalgar, S107
HMS Trenchant, S91
S616 Triomphant, SNLE (SSBN)
USS Triton SSRN/SSN-586
HMS Triumph, S93
USS Tucson, SSN-770
HMS Turbulent, S87

U

V
  (SSN)
HMS Valiant, S102 (SSN)
  (SSBN)
HMS Vanguard, S28 (SSBN)
HMS Vengeance, S31 (SSBN)
K-157 Vepr
 
HMS Victorious, S29 (SSBN)
HMS Vigilant, S30 (SSBN)
S618 Vigilant, SNLE (SSBN)
K-456 Vilyuchinsk
USS Virginia, SSN-774

W
HMS Warspite, S103 (SSN)
USS West Virginia, SSBN-736
USS Wyoming, SSBN-742

X

Y
Yury Dolgorukiy

Z

References

"Fact File: Attack Submarines - SSN. United States Navy.
"Fact File: Fleet Ballistic Missile Submarines - SSBN". United States Navy.
"Submarine Service: Operations and Support". Royal Navy.
"SSBN-726 Ohio-Class FBM Submarines". Federation of American Scientists.

Nuclear

Submarines